The Gale House can refer to any of three houses built by Frank Lloyd Wright in Oak Park, Illinois:

 Mrs. Thomas H. Gale House
 Thomas H. Gale House
 Walter Gale House